The Genocide and Resistance Research Centre of Lithuania ( or LGGRTC) is a state-funded research institute in Lithuania dedicated to "the study of genocide, crimes against humanity, and war crimes in Lithuania; the study of the persecution of local residents by occupying regimes; the study of armed and unarmed resistance to occupying regimes; the initiation of the legal evaluation of the activities of the organisers and implementers of genocide; and the commemoration of freedom fighters and genocide victims." The centre was founded on 25 October 1992 by the Supreme Council of the Lithuanian Republic as the "State Genocide Research Centre of Lithuania". It is a member organisation of the Platform of European Memory and Conscience.

Ideology
The Center considers the resistance to be the Lithuanian nationalist partisans during World War II who fought communist partisans. This includes groups such as the Lithuanian Activist Front. One anti-Soviet partisan controversially honored by the center is Jonas Noreika, who led the extermination of the Jews in the city of Plungė. The Centre recommends former members of resistance for larger state pensions and other awards.

The Center is a strong advocate of the "Lithuanian genocide thesis" and sees itself as a "guardian" of Lithuanian memory. The Center uses a broadened definition of "genocide" including the targeting of social, political, and economic groups by Stalin.  The Center declares an equivalence between Nazi and Soviet crimes: this "double genocide" formulation is common in central and eastern Europe, and particularly in the Baltic states. However, in practice the Nazi genocide of the Jews and Lithuanian collaboration in it are minimized, while the "genocide" of Lithuanians by Soviet partisans is described extensively. One plaque at the Genocide Center says that these partisans were "mostly of Jewish nationality [since] native people didn't support Soviet partisans."

Activities
In 1998, Lithuania passed a law restricting employment in the public sector for former employees of the KGB, the MGB, and other Soviet security institutions. The centre and the State Security Department had the authority to determine whether a person was an employee of the KGB. In 2002, commemorating the 30th anniversary of Romas Kalanta's self-immolation, Seimas listed May 14 as the Civil Resistance Day based on recommendations by the centre.

The centre publishes the journal Genocidas ir rezistencija. One of its long-term research projects is a database and multi-volume publication of names and biographies of the victims of the Soviet and Nazi persecutions.  In 2001–2001, the centre handled some 22,000 applications for compensation from the Foundation "Remembrance, Responsibility and Future".

The centre operates the Museum of Occupations and Freedom Fights in the former prison of KGB in Vilnius and memorial at the Tuskulėnai Manor. Prior to 2018 the museum was known as "the Museum of Genocide Victims" reflecting a broadened definition of the term "genocide" used by the Genocide and Resistance Research Centre, even though only a few historians consider these events a genocide. Only a small part of the museum space, a small room added in 2011 following international criticism, is devoted to the Holocaust in Lithuania, the event that is universally considered a genocide. In 2018, the museum was renamed to the Museum of Occupations and Freedom Fights.

In 1999–2002, the centre was involved in legal proceedings regarding Nachman Dushanski, an Israeli citizen. In 2007 the head of the Genocide Center at the time, Arvydas Anusauskas, initiated a criminal investigation against Holocaust survivor Yitzhak Arad who headed The International Commission for the Evaluation of the Crimes of the Nazi and Soviet Occupation Regimes in Lithuania. The investigation, which derailed the work of the international commission whose members resigned in protest, was viewed internationally as a "contemptible farce", an attempt to erase Lithuanian's history of collaboration with the Nazis, and victim blaming, particularly due to the lack of prosecution of the many Lithuanian Nazi collaborators.

Directors
The centre's director is nominated by the Prime Minister of Lithuania and confirmed by the Seimas (Lithuanian parliament).
On 26 November 1992 Juozas Starkauskas was approved by the Lithuanian government to be the acting head of the centre.
On 17 February 1994 the Seimas appointed Vytautas Skuodis general director of the reorganized centre.
On 18 February 1997 Dalia Kuodytė was appointed general director.
In 2009, the Seimas confirmed Birutė Burauskaitė, a dissident of long standing, as the Center's director.

See also 
 International Commission for the Evaluation of the Crimes of the Nazi and Soviet Occupation Regimes in Lithuania

References

External links 
 Official website
 Defending History- The Genocide and Research Center of Lithuania

Antisemitism in Lithuania
Research institutes established in 1992
Research institutes in Lithuania
History institutes
Commemoration of communist crimes
Organizations based in Vilnius
Platform of European Memory and Conscience
Holocaust studies